Herman Johan Eggink (born 3 August 1949) is a retired Dutch rower. He competed at the 1972 Summer Olympics in the coxed eights event and finished in ninth place.

References

1949 births
Living people
Dutch male rowers
Olympic rowers of the Netherlands
Rowers at the 1972 Summer Olympics
Sportspeople from Groningen (city)